Ulinzi Warriors is a basketball club based in Nairobi, Kenya. The club is affiliated with the Kenyan defence forces and is often nicknamed soldiers. The team are two-times national champions of Kenya, having won the KBF Premier League twice. The team folded in 2007 but returned in 2012.

As of late 2021, the team has been Kenya's national champion.

Honours
KBF Premier League
Winners (2): 2015, 2019, 2021
Runners-up (2): 2014, 2018

Players

Current roster
The following is the Ulinzi Warriors roster for the 2022 BAL Qualifying Tournaments.

Staff

References

Basketball teams in Kenya

Road to BAL teams
Nakuru